HD 98618 is a yellow-hued star in the northern circumpolar constellation of Ursa Major. It is invisible to the naked eye, having an apparent visual magnitude of just 7.65. Based on  measurements, this star is located at a distance of 135 light years from the Sun based on parallax, and is drifting further away with a radial velocity of +7.1 km/s. It is a likely member of the thin disk population and is orbiting the Milky Way at about the same distance from the Galactic Center as the Sun.

The stellar classification of HD 98618 is G5V, which matches an ordinary G-type main-sequence star that is generating energy through hydrogen fusion in the core region. It is almost identical in most respects to the Sun; it has therefore been proposed as a candidate solar twin. However, like the solar twin 18 Scorpii, HD 98618 has a lithium abundance significantly higher than that of the Sun ([Li/H] = +0.45 ± 0.08). Meléndez & Ramírez (2007) have suggested that HD 98618 be considered a "quasi solar twin", since they have now identified a solar twin, HIP 56948, with lithium content identical within the observational error to the Sun's.

The star appears roughly the same age as the Sun, although the level of chromospheric activity suggests it may be older. It is rotating with a leisurely projected rotational velocity of 2.1 km/s. The mass and size of the star are a few percent higher than the Sun. It is radiating around 10% more luminosity than the Sun from its photosphere at an effective temperature of 5,812 K.

References

External links
 Universetoday.com article
 David Darling encyclopedia
 SIMBAD entry

G-type main-sequence stars
HD, 098618
Ursa Major (constellation)
Durchmusterung objects
098618
055459